Mathew Hayman (born 20 April 1978) is an Australian former professional road bicycle racer, who rode professionally between 2000 and 2019 for the ,  and  teams. During his career, Hayman was an experienced and respected domestique, as he typically took on a supporting role within his team. Hayman was also a specialist in the cobbled classics, and was the winner of Paris–Roubaix in 2016. Following his retirement from racing after the 2019 Tour Down Under, Hayman remained with the  team as a part-time directeur sportif alongside a "special projects" position.

Personal life
Hayman was born in western Sydney, but the family was living near Goulburn in country New South Wales when he became interested in cycling, largely due to his older brother. He started racing in Canberra, and, following his brother, moved to Europe to further a potential cycling career in 1997. He raced as an amateur with Rabobank's under-23 team, based in The Netherlands. In 2006 he married Kym Shirley, an Australian professional cyclist. The couple has a son, born in 2011, and twins born in 2017.

Career
He completed his first Paris–Roubaix the same year. He stayed with Rabobank for ten years, achieving a number of good results during that time. Hayman has refused to discuss Dr Geert Leinders when asked about his time at Rabobank. Riding for Australia in the 2006 Commonwealth Games in Melbourne as a domestique in support of Allan Davis, it was Hayman who came away with the gold medal in the road race.

Hayman left  at the end of the 2013 season, and joined  for the 2014 season.

On 10 April 2016, he won Paris–Roubaix, the eighth professional victory of his career. He was part of a breakaway of 16 riders that escaped from the peloton in the early stages of the race, which was later joined by a group which was formed after the peloton broke up following a crash 115 km from the finish. In the closing stages Hayman managed to close the gap on a select group of riders attacking from the lead group, and in the final sprint at Roubaix Velodrome, he beat Tom Boonen, Ian Stannard, Sep Vanmarcke and Edvald Boasson Hagen. His first reaction was one of disbelief: "I can’t believe it [...] This is my favorite race, it's a race I dream of every year. This year I didn’t even dare to dream."

On 18 September 2018 Hayman announced that he intended to retire after the 2019 Tour Down Under.

Career achievements

Major results

1996
 2nd  Time trial, UCI Road World Junior Road Championships
 2nd Time trial, National Junior Road Championships
1999
 1st  Overall Le Triptyque des Monts et Châteaux
 2nd Overall Olympia's Tour
1st Stage 3b (TTT)
 3rd Omloop der Kempen
2000
 5th Overall Sparkassen Giro Bochum
 6th Overall Guldensporentweedaagse
2001
 1st Trofeo Soller
 1st  Overall Challenge Mallorca
1st  Sprints classification
1st Stage 5
 6th Overall Circuit Franco-Belge
 7th Milano–Torino
2002
 6th Henk Vos Memorial
 9th Overall Ster Elektrotoer
 10th Overall Circuit Franco-Belge
2003
 10th Gent–Wevelgem
2004
 4th Tour de Rijke
 10th Overall Sachsen Tour
 10th Schaal Sels-Merksem
2005
 1st  Overall Sachsen Tour
 8th Overall Three Days of De Panne
 8th Overall Circuit Franco-Belge
 8th Dwars door Vlaanderen
 10th Trofeo Calvià
2006
 1st  Road race, Commonwealth Games
 2nd Profronde van Fryslan
 3rd Overall Oddset-Rundfahrt
2007
 4th Dwars door Vlaanderen
 5th Tour de Rijke
 7th Profronde van Fryslan
 9th Overall Tour of Qatar
2008
 10th Ronde van het Groene Hart
2009
 4th Gent–Wevelgem
 7th Trofeo Inca
 8th Dwars door Vlaanderen
 8th Memorial Rik Van Steenbergen
 10th Tour de Rijke
2010
 5th Dwars door Vlaanderen
2011
 1st Paris–Bourges
 3rd Omloop Het Nieuwsblad
 4th Dwars door Vlaanderen
 6th Overall Circuit Franco-Belge
 10th Paris–Roubaix
2012
 8th Paris–Roubaix
2013
 3rd Dwars door Vlaanderen
2016
 1st Paris–Roubaix

Grand Tour results timeline

Classics & Monuments results timelines

References

External links

Profile on Australia Cycling

1978 births
Living people
Australian male cyclists
Commonwealth Games gold medallists for Australia
Cyclists at the 2006 Commonwealth Games
Cyclists from Sydney
People from the Inner West (Sydney)
Commonwealth Games medallists in cycling
ACT Academy of Sport alumni
Medallists at the 2006 Commonwealth Games